Hemimerus is a genus of earwigs, in the family Hemimeridae (suborder Hemimerina). It is one of two genera in the family of Hemimeridae, and contains ten species:
Hemimerus advectus Rehn & Rehn, 1936
Hemimerus bouvieri Chopard, 1934
Hemimerus chevalieri Chopard, 1934
Hemimerus deceptus Rehn & Rehn, 1936
Hemimerus hanseni Sharp, 1895
Hemimerus prolixus Maa, 1974
Hemimerus sessor Rehn & Rehn, 1936
Hemimerus talpoides Walker, 1871
Hemimerus vicinus Rehn & Rehn, 1936
Hemimerus vosseleri Rehn & Rehn, 1936

References

External links

 An example specimen of the species Hemimerus talpoides from the Tree of Life (note that the species is incorrectly labeled)
 An example of a female Hemimerus vosseleri from the Australian National Insect Collection 

Dermaptera genera
Hemimerina